Cristian Alejandro La Grottería (born July 25, 1974 in La Plata) is a retired Argentine footballer, who last worked as assistant coach of Lega Pro club Catania. He also has Italian citizenship.

Playing career
La Grottería began his career playing professionally at Estudiantes de La Plata. He also had short spells with Argentine lower division club Club Atlético San Martín (San Juan) and San Martín de Mendoza. His previous clubs in Italy include Padova, Palermo and Ancona. He retired in June 2011 after two seasons with Lega Pro Seconda Divisione club Bassano Virtus.

Post-playing and coaching career
After retirement, La Grottería agreed to stay at Bassano Virtus in a non-playing role as a technical area coordinator. He then also served as assistant coach  on a couple different stints before leaving the club in February 2017 to become Mario Petrone's assistant at Catania. He left the club just a few weeks later, on 8 March 2017, following Petrone's resignations.

References

External links
 Argentine Primera statistics  
 

1974 births
Living people
Association football forwards
Argentine footballers
Italian footballers
Footballers from La Plata
Estudiantes de La Plata footballers
San Martín de San Juan footballers
A.C. Ancona players
Palermo F.C. players
Calcio Padova players
S.P.A.L. players
Expatriate footballers in Italy
Serie B players